Cucumis hystrix is a monoecious climbing vine in the family Cucurbitaceae. The specific epithet (hystrix) is New Latin for "porcupine".

Distribution
Cucumis hystrix is native to northern Thailand, northern Laos, northern Vietnam, Myanmar, southeastern India, and China.

Description
The leaves and petioles of the plant are hairy and the leaves have 3-5 lobes and are cordate at the bases with acute apexes. The flowers are solitary and yellow in color and their petals measure 8-10 millimeters in length in males. The fruit is pendent and yellow-green in color and ovate in shape and is covered in spike-like pustules. They contain numerous seeds. It flowers and fruits from September through December. It grows in scrub jungles, forests edges, and along roadsides up to 5905.5 feet (1800 m) in elevation.

Hybridization
It has shown strong resistance against downy mildew and other diseases that affect members of the genus Cucumis and has been successfully hybridized with Cucumis sativus to create a disease-resistant cucumber plant.

References

hystrix
Plants described in 1952
Flora of Thailand
Flora of Vietnam
Flora of Laos
Flora of China
Flora of India (region)
Flora of Myanmar
Vines